Alticus montanoi, Montano's rockskipper, is a species of combtooth blenny (family Blenniidae) in the genus Alticus. It is a tropical blenny, and is known from the South China Sea, in the western Pacific Ocean. The blennies are oviparous, and form distinct pairs when mating. They feed primarily off of benthic algae. The specific name honors the collector of the type, the French ethnologist Joseph Montaro.

References

External links
 Alticus montanoi at www.fishwise.co.za.
 Alticus montanoi at ITIS
 Alticus montanoi at WoRMS

Fish described in 1880
montanoi
Taxa named by Henri Émile Sauvage